Greymare is a rural locality in the Southern Downs Region, Queensland, Australia. In the  Greymare had a population of 64 people.

Geography 
The Cunningham Highway enters the locality from the north-east (Montrose / Rodgers Creek) and exits to the north (Thane).

The South-Western railway line enters the locality from the north-east (Montrose) and exits to the north (Thane). Greymare railway station served the locality but is now abandoned.

History 
The locality was named after a grey mare which belonged to pastoralist John Deuchar. This horse would escape from any paddock and head for the Greymare Creek. The Graymare railway station was named in 1904.

Toolburra South State School opened on 2 June 1879. In 1924 it was renamed Greymare State School. It closed in 1966.

In the  Greymare had a population of 64 people.

References 

Southern Downs Region
Localities in Queensland